Axial parallelism (also called gyroscopic stiffness, inertia or rigidity, or "rigidity in space") is the characteristic of a rotating body in which the direction of the axis of rotation remains fixed as the object moves through space. In astronomy, this characteristic is found in astronomical bodies in orbit. It is the same effect that causes a gyroscope's axis of rotation to remain constant as Earth rotates, allowing the devices to measure Earth's rotation.

Examples

Earth's axial parallelism

The Earth's orbit, with its axis tilted at 23.5 degrees, exhibits approximate axial parallelism, maintaining its direction towards Polaris (the "North Star") year-round. Together with the Earth's axial tilt, this is one of the primary reasons for the Earth's seasons, as illustrated by the diagram to the right. It is also the reason that the stars appear fixed in the night sky, such as a "fixed" pole star, throughout Earth's orbit around the Sun.

Minor variation in the direction of the axis, known as axial precession, takes place over the course of 26,000 years. As a result, over the next 11,000 years the Earth's axis will move to point towards Vega instead of Polaris.

Other astronomical examples

Axial parallelism is widely observed in astronomy. For example, the axial parallelism of the moon's orbital plane is a key factor in the phenomenon of eclipses. The moon's orbital axis precesses a full circle during the 18 year, 10 day saros cycle. When the moon's orbital tilt is aligned with the ecliptic tilt, it is 29 degrees from the ecliptic, while when they are anti-aligned (9 years later), the orbital inclination is only 18 degrees.

In addition, the rings of Saturn remain in a fixed direction as that planet rotates around the sun.

Explanation
Early gyroscopes were used to demonstrate the principle, most notably the Foucault's gyroscope experiment. Prior to the invention of the gyroscope, it had been explained by scientists in various ways. Early modern astronomer David Gregory, a contemporary of Isaac Newton, wrote:
To explain the Motion of the Celestial Bodies about their proper Axes, given in Position, and the Revolutions of them… If a Body be said to be moved about a given Axe, being in other respects not moved, that Axe is suppos'd to be unmov'd, and every point out of it to describe a Circle, to whose Plane the Axis is perpendicular. And for that reason, if a Body be carried along a line, and at the same time be revolved about a given Axe; the Axe, in all the time of the Body's motion, will continue parallel to it self. Nor is any thing else required to preserve this Parallelism, than that no other Motion besides these two be impressed upon the Body; for if there be no other third Motion in it, its Axe will continue always parallel to the Right-line, to which it was once parallel.

This gyroscopic effect is described in modern times as "gyroscopic stiffness" or "rigidity in space". The Newtonian mechanical explanation is known as the conservation of angular momentum.

See also 
 Axial tilt
 Polar motion
 Rotation around a fixed axis
 True polar wander

References

Technical factors of astrology
Celestial mechanics